The 1975–76 Boston Celtics season was their 30th in the National Basketball Association (NBA) and concluded with their 13th championship, defeating the Phoenix Suns in six games in the 1976 NBA Finals to win their 13th NBA Championship . The Celtics also won their division for the 5th consecutive season, and made their 14th finals appearance.

Offseason

Draft picks

Roster

Regular season and postseason recap
The Celtics lost Don Chaney to the American Basketball Association before the 1975–76 season. To fill the gap in the backcourt they traded Paul Westphal to the Phoenix Suns for Charlie Scott, who had averaged more than 20 points in each of the previous three seasons. Despite an uncharacteristically weak bench, the Celtics finished in first place in their division and the second best record in the NBA this season. Boston earned a shot at another NBA title by defeating the Buffalo Braves and then the Cleveland Cavaliers in the playoffs.

Boston's opponents in the 1976 NBA Finals were the Phoenix Suns, who had posted a 42–40 regular-season record. The Team in Green was the oddsmakers' choice in the contest. The Celtics took the first two games at Boston Garden, but the Suns came back to win games 3 and 4 on their home court. Game 5 ranks among the all-time thrillers in NBA history. The Suns trailed by 5 points with less than a minute left on the clock, but Westphal made up the deficit almost single-handedly, sending the game into a first overtime period, which ended in a tie.

John Havlicek's basket with 2 seconds remaining in double overtime gave the Celtics a one-point lead, which Boston stretched to two points after sinking a technical foul. Then the Suns' Garfield Heard hit a last-second basket to send the contest into a third overtime. The longest game in NBA history finally ended, after three extra periods, with the Celtics winning 128–126. Two days later Boston captured yet another NBA championship, the 13th in franchise history.

Season standings

Record vs. opponents

Game log

|-
| 1
| October 24
| Houston
| W 109–94
|
|
|
| Boston Garden
| 1–0
|-
| 2
| October 29
| Golden State
| W 115–106
|
|
|
| Boston Garden
| 2–0
|-
| 3
| October 31
| Portland
| W 112–94
|
|
|
| Boston Garden
| 3–0

|-
| 4
| November 1
| @ Chicago
| L 82–84
|
|
|
| Chicago Stadium
| 3–1
|-
| 5
| November 5
| Buffalo
| W 105–95
|
|
|
| Boston Garden
| 4–1
|-
| 6
| November 7
| @ Milwaukee
| L 101–104
| Dave Cowens (28)
|
|
| MECCA Arena
| 4–2
|-
| 7
| November 8
| @ Detroit
| W 118–104
|
|
|
| Cobo Arena
| 5–2
|-
| 8
| November 11
| Atlanta
| L 91–100
| Jo Jo White (24)
|
|
| Hartford Civic Center
| 5–3
|-
| 9
| November 13
| @ Washington
| L 107–110
|
|
|
| Capital Centre
| 5–4
|-
| 10
| November 14
| Philadelphia
| L 109–119
|
|
|
| Boston Garden
| 5–5
|-
| 11
| November 15
| @ Buffalo
| W 112–110
|
|
|
| Buffalo Memorial Auditorium
| 6–5
|-
| 12
| November 21
| New York
| W 110–101
|
|
|
| Boston Garden
| 7–5
|-
| 13
| November 23
| @ Cleveland
| W 105–90
|
|
|
| Richfield Coliseum
| 8–5
|-
| 14
| November 26
| Seattle
| L 109–110
|
|
|
| Boston Garden
| 8–6
|-
| 15
| November 28
| Atlanta
| W 114–107
|
|
|
| Boston Garden
| 9–6

Playoffs

|- align="center" bgcolor="#ccffcc"
| 1
| April 21
| Buffalo
| W 107–98
| Dave Cowens (30)
| Dave Cowens (17)
| Jo Jo White (8)
| Boston Garden13,919
| 1–0
|- align="center" bgcolor="#ccffcc"
| 2
| April 23
| Buffalo
| W 101–96
| Dave Cowens (27)
| Dave Cowens (18)
| Charlie Scott (6)
| Boston Garden15,320
| 2–0
|- align="center" bgcolor="#ffcccc"
| 3
| April 25
| @ Buffalo
| L 93–98
| Jo Jo White (26)
| Dave Cowens (14)
| Charlie Scott (7)
| Buffalo Memorial Auditorium12,079
| 2–1
|- align="center" bgcolor="#ffcccc"
| 4
| April 28
| @ Buffalo
| L 122–124
| Dave Cowens (29)
| Dave Cowens (26)
| Jo Jo White (11)
| Buffalo Memorial Auditorium16,193
| 2–2
|- align="center" bgcolor="#ccffcc"
| 5
| April 30
| Buffalo
| W 99–88
| Dave Cowens (30)
| Paul Silas (22)
| Jo Jo White (6)
| Boston Garden15,320
| 3–2
|- align="center" bgcolor="#ccffcc"
| 6
| May 2
| @ Buffalo
| W 104–100
| Jo Jo White (23)
| Paul Silas (18)
| Charlie Scott (8)
| Buffalo Memorial Auditorium16,261
| 4–2
|-

|- align="center" bgcolor="#ccffcc"
| 1
| May 5
| Cleveland
| W 111–99
| John Havlicek (26)
| Dave Cowens (12)
| Dave Cowens (7)
| Boston Garden14,264
| 1–0
|- align="center" bgcolor="#ccffcc"
| 2
| May 9
| Cleveland
| W 94–89
| Jo Jo White (24)
| Paul Silas (19)
| three players tied (4)
| Boston Garden12,098
| 2–0
|- align="center" bgcolor="#ffcccc"
| 3
| May 11
| @ Cleveland
| L 78–83
| Jo Jo White (22)
| Paul Silas (21)
| Jo Jo White (7)
| Richfield Coliseum21,564
| 2–1
|- align="center" bgcolor="#ffcccc"
| 4
| May 14
| @ Cleveland
| L 87–106
| Jo Jo White (23)
| Dave Cowens (18)
| Dave Cowens (4)
| Richfield Coliseum21,564
| 2–2
|- align="center" bgcolor="#ccffcc"
| 5
| May 16
| Cleveland
| W 99–94
| Dave Cowens (26)
| Paul Silas (13)
| Dave Cowens (6)
| Boston Garden12,951
| 3–2
|- align="center" bgcolor="#ccffcc"
| 6
| May 18
| @ Cleveland
| W 94–87
| Jo Jo White (29)
| Dave Cowens (18)
| White, Cowens (5)
| Richfield Coliseum21,564
| 4–2
|-

|- align="center" bgcolor="#ccffcc"
| 1
| May 23
| Phoenix
| W 98–87
| Dave Cowens (25)
| Dave Cowens (21)
| Dave Cowens (10)
| Boston Garden15,320
| 1–0
|- align="center" bgcolor="#ccffcc"
| 2
| May 27
| Phoenix
| W 105–90
| John Havlicek (23)
| Paul Silas (17)
| Jo Jo White (9)
| Boston Garden15,320
| 2–0
|- align="center" bgcolor="#ffcccc"
| 3
| May 30
| @ Phoenix
| L 98–105
| Jo Jo White (24)
| Dave Cowens (17)
| Charlie Scott (5)
| Arizona Veterans Memorial Coliseum12,284
| 2–1
|- align="center" bgcolor="#ffcccc"
| 4
| June 2
| @ Phoenix
| L 107–109
| Jo Jo White (25)
| Paul Silas (14)
| Jo Jo White (5)
| Arizona Veterans Memorial Coliseum13,306
| 2–2
|- align="center" bgcolor="#ccffcc"
| 5
| June 4
| Phoenix
| W 128–126 (3OT)
| Jo Jo White (33)
| Dave Cowens (19)
| Jo Jo White (9)
| Boston Garden15,320
| 3–2
|- align="center" bgcolor="#ccffcc"
| 6
| June 6
| @ Phoenix
| W 87–80
| Charlie Scott (25)
| Dave Cowens (17)
| Jo Jo White (6)
| Arizona Veterans Memorial Coliseum13,306
| 4–2
|-

References

 Celtics on Database Basketball
 Celtics on Basketball Reference

Boston Celtics seasons
Boston Celtics
Eastern Conference (NBA) championship seasons
NBA championship seasons
Boston Celtics
Boston Celtics
Celtics
Celtics